Alassane Touré (born 9 February 1989) is a French footballer who plays for Saint-Brice FC.

References

External links

 
 
 
 

1989 births
Living people
People from Sarcelles
French sportspeople of Senegalese descent
Footballers from Val-d'Oise
Association football defenders
French footballers
RC Lens players
FC Astra Giurgiu players
A.F.C. Tubize players
Ligue 1 players
Ligue 2 players
Liga I players
French expatriate footballers
Expatriate footballers in Romania
Expatriate footballers in Belgium
French expatriate sportspeople in Romania
French expatriate sportspeople in Belgium